The CP 2240-class is an electric multiple unit used by the national train operator Comboios de Portugal. Each EMU features 3 cars, with the ends being driving trailers, and the middle being a power car (which houses the traction motors).

The units were assembled between 2003 and 2005, by Alstom, reusing the old Sorefame body shells belonging to the 2100, 2150 and 2200-class EMU's, to keep cost down and avoid fully scrapping old rolling stock. The bogies were custom-built with new Alstom traction motors, and are in the 1668mm Iberian gauge.

They are able to operate in multiple configuration with up to 3 units, for a total of 9 passenger cars.

Statistics Sheet 

Source:

Manufacturers 

 Body: Sorefame
 Electrical Equipment and Interior: Alstom
 Propulsion: Alstom
 Main Transformer: Pauwels
 Pantograph: Schunk
 Pneumatic Brakes: Knorr-Bremse
 CCTV System: Petards Group PLC

Main Characteristics 

 Top Speed: 120km/h (75mph)
 Tare Weight: 135,7t
 Bogies: 6 (2 per carriage)
 End couplers: Automatic, Dellner
 Intermediate couplers: Semi-permanent, Scharfenberg
 Passenger Space: 264 seated, 163 standing
 Seat Layout: 2+3 (except 2295, 2296 and 2297: 2+2)
 Doors: Automatic single-leaf plug doors, centrally locked
 Number of Doors: 5 per side (2 in each trailer car, 1 in the central power car)

Passenger Commodities 
 Passenger Information System, which includes pre-recorded audio station announcements, dot-matrix displays that show exterior temperature, current time, and next stop.
 Air conditioning system.

Safety Features 
 CONVEL
 Dead-man's handle
 Ground radio
 Black-box (speed recorder)

References

Electric multiple units of Portugal